In the 20th century, the United States began to invalidate laws against blasphemy which had been on the books since before the founding of the nation , or prosecutions on that ground, as it was decided that they violated the American Constitution. The First Amendment to the United States Constitution provides that "Congress shall make no law respecting an establishment of religion, or prohibiting the free exercise thereof; or abridging the freedom of speech, or of the press...", and these restrictions were extended to state and local governments in the early 20th century. While there are no federal laws which forbid "religious vilification" or "religious insult" or "hate speech", some states have blasphemy statutes.

Blasphemy laws 

In 2009, The New York Times reported that Massachusetts, Michigan, Oklahoma, South Carolina, Wyoming, and Pennsylvania had laws that made reference to blasphemy. Pennsylvania's blasphemy law was found unconstitutional in 2010. Some US states still have blasphemy laws on the books from the founding days.

Massachusetts 
For example, Chapter 272 of the Massachusetts General Laws –  a provision based on a similar colonial-era Massachusetts Bay statute enacted in 1697 – states:

Maryland 
The history of Maryland's blasphemy statutes suggests that even into the 1930s, the First Amendment was not recognized as preventing states from passing such laws. An 1879 codification of Maryland statutes prohibited blasphemy:

According to the marginalia, this statute was adopted in 1819, and a similar law dates back to 1723. In 1904, the statute was still on the books at 
Art. 27, sec. 20, unaltered in text. As late as 1939, this statute was still the law of Maryland. But in 1972, in Maryland v. Irving K. West, the Maryland Court of Appeals (the state's highest court) declared the blasphemy law unconstitutional. This law was still on the books until at least 2003.

Maine 

Maine's law reads as follows:

Michigan 

Michigan's law reads as follows:

History: 1931, Act 328, Eff. Sept. 18, 1931 ;-- CL 1948, 750.102
Former Law: See section 17 of Ch. 158 of R.S. 1846, being CL 1857, § 5872; CL 1871, § 7707; How., § 9293; CL 1897, § 11706; CL 1915, § 15480; and CL 1929, § 16832.

Secondarily, there is an "anti-profanity" law, which includes "blasphemy" elements, and reads as follows.

History: 1931, Act 328, Eff. Sept. 18, 1931 ;-- CL 1948, 750.103
Former Law: See section 18 of Ch. 158 of R.S. 1846, being CL 1857, § 5873; CL 1871, § 7708; How., § 9294; CL 1897, § 11707; CL 1915, § 15481; and CL 1929, § 16833.

Prosecutions for blasphemy

Massachusetts 
The last person to be jailed in the United States for blasphemy was Abner Kneeland in 1838 (a Massachusetts case: Commonwealth v. Kneeland). From 1925, the Supreme Court applied the Bill of Rights to all states.

In February 1926, Lithuanian-American Communist Anthony Bimba was charged in Brockton, Massachusetts with blasphemy under a law passed during the time of the Salem Witch Trials more than two centuries earlier, as well as sedition. A widely publicized week-long trial followed, during which Bimba's attorney likened atheism to religious belief and maintained that individuals had a right under the United States constitution to believe or disbelieve in the existence of a God. Bimba was ultimately found not guilty of blasphemy but convicted of sedition, for which he was fined $100.

Maine 
In 1921, Lithuanian-American Michael X. Mockus was convicted in Maine. He appealed to the Supreme Judicial Court of Maine on March 25, 1921 in State v. Mockus and lost the appeal.

Arkansas 
The last known U.S. conviction for blasphemy was of atheist activist Charles Lee Smith. In 1928, he rented a storefront in Little Rock, Arkansas, and gave out free atheist literature there. The sign in the window read: "Evolution Is True. The Bible's a Lie. God's a Ghost." For this he was charged with violating the city ordinance against blasphemy. Because he was an atheist and therefore could not swear the court's religious oath to tell the truth, he was not permitted to testify in his own defense. The judge then dismissed the original charge, replacing it with one of distributing obscene, slanderous, or scurrilous literature. Smith was convicted, fined $25, and served most of a twenty-six-day jail sentence. His high-profile fast while behind bars drew national media attention. Upon his release, he immediately resumed his atheist activities, was again charged with blasphemy, and this time the charge held. In his trial he was again denied the right to testify and was sentenced to ninety days in jail and a fine of $100. Released on $1,000 bail, Smith appealed the verdict. The case then dragged on for several years until it was finally dismissed.

Overturned blasphemy laws

New York (1952): Joseph Burstyn, Inc. v. Wilson
The U.S. Supreme Court in Joseph Burstyn, Inc. v. Wilson, 343 U.S. 495 (1952) held that the New York State blasphemy law was an unconstitutional prior restraint on freedom of speech. The court stated that "It is not the business of government in our nation to suppress real or imagined attacks upon a particular religious doctrine, whether they appear in publications, speeches or motion pictures."

Pennsylvania (2010): Kalman v. Cortes
The Pennsylvania General Assembly enacted a blasphemy law in 1977, that forbade corporations from incorporating names containing words that "constitute blasphemy, profane cursing or swearing, or that profane the Lord’s name." In 2007, filmmaker George Kalman had filed a limited liability company named I Choose Hell Productions, LLC. A week later he had received an unsigned letter explaining that his application was rejected because his company’s name could not “contain words that constitute blasphemy.” In February 2009, Kalman filed suit to have the provision against blasphemy struck down as unconstitutional. During the trial, Kalman explained that at one point he had become suicidal and felt he had to choose between death and hell. This became the inspiration for naming his film company, stories that he would tell about how to choose life. On June 30, 2010, U.S. District Judge Michael M. Bayslon of the Eastern District of Pennsylvania, in a 68-page opinion, ruled in favor of Kalman, finding that Pennsylvania's blasphemy statute violated both the Establishment Clause and the Free Exercise Clause of the First Amendment to the United States Constitution.

References

Further reading

For a history of blasphemy laws in the United States, see amicus brief, filed 12/24/09 for Case No. 2:09-cv-00684 in Kalman v. Cortes, 723 F. Supp. 2d 766.

United States
United States
United States constitutional law
Blasphemy